Harvey is an unincorporated community in Brazos County, in the U.S. state of Texas. According to the Handbook of Texas, the community had a population of 310 in 2000. It is located within the Bryan-College Station metropolitan area.

History
Harvey was established in 1879 and was named for the "Father of Brazos County", Colonel Harvey Mitchell, who settled in Boonville and contributed to the area's development. The community was first settled by planters in the 1860s and grew up around Bethel Church. A community center was established in the 1970s. A post office was established at Harvey in 1890 with J.W. Barron as postmaster. The community also had a general store (ran by Barron), a gristmill, and a cotton gin. Ranching became the dominant force of the community when the soil diminished after cotton production. Harvey had a population of 25 in 1910. It had two churches and several scattered houses in the 1930s. The population grew to 110 in 1964 and jumped to 310 from 1970 through 2000.

Geography

Education
A school called Bethel Academy was established in the late 1800s and had 50 students enrolled. There were two schools in the 1930s. Today, the community is served by the Bryan Independent School District.

References

Unincorporated communities in Brazos County, Texas
Unincorporated communities in Texas